Dame Lilian Charlotte Barker, DBE, JP (21 February 1874 – 21 May 1955) was first British female assistant prison commissioner whose work provided the basis for the modern day humanitarian prison system for female correctional facilities in Great Britain.

Early life 
Born in Islington, Barker was educated at the local primary school system and graduated from Whitelands College in Chelsea in the 1890s. Lilian was one of six children and her father, who was a Kentish Town tobacconist, was an alcoholic.

Career 
Lilian Barker graduated from Whitelands College in the 1890s. She became a schoolteacher who specialised in troubled children. She became the Principal of the London County Council’s Women’s Institute correction facility in 1913. After serving for two years, Barker resigned from her post to join Britain's war effort during World War I, as lady superintendent of the Royal Arsenal, Woolwich, overseeing 30,000 women munitions workers.

Following the war, Barker joined the Ministry of Labour's training department and, in 1923, was appointed governor of the Borstal Institution for Girls at Aylesbury. Under her administration, Barker made sweeping reforms that focused on education and rehabilitation. 

In 1935, Barker became the first British female assistant prison commissioner. Barker would work to reform women's prisons throughout England, Wales and Scotland based on her work at Aylesbury until her death in 1955.

Personal life 
Barker was a lesbian. She met her partner, Florence Francis, whilst working as a Sunday school teacher. In 1914, after Barker's mother's death, Barker moved in with Francis and her family. The women lived together for 40 years, until Barker's death in 1955.

Damehood
Barker was named a Dame Commander of the Order of the British Empire (DBE) in 1944 for her "services in connection with the welfare of women and girls".

Further reading
Hartley, Cathy and Susan Leckey. Historical Dictionary of British Women. London: Europa Publications Limited, 2003. 
Gore, Elizabeth, The Better Fight. The story of Dame Lilian Barker, London: Geoffrey Bles Ltd, 1965.

References

External links
Biography of Dame Lilian Barker, DBE; accessed 24 June 2014. 

Print made by Francis Ernest Jackson at the British Museum
CHIEF LADY SUPERINTENDENT MISS LILIAN BARKER, iwm.org.uk.

1874 births
1955 deaths
British prison officers
Schoolteachers from London
Dames Commander of the Order of the British Empire
People from Islington (district)
English justices of the peace
Place of death missing
English lesbians
19th-century English LGBT people
20th-century English LGBT people